This is a list of television programs formerly or currently broadcast by USA Network.

Current programming

Original programming

Scripted

Drama
Chucky (2021)

Unscripted

Docuseries
Race for the Championship (2022)

Reality
Chrisley Knows Best (2014)
Miz & Mrs. (2018)
Temptation Island (2019)
Growing Up Chrisley (2019)
Straight Up Steve Austin (2019)
The Rev (2021)
She's The Boss (2021)
America's Big Deal (2021)
The Courtship (2022)
Austin Dillon's Life in the Fast Lane (2022)
Barmageddon (2022)
Race to Survive Alaska (2023)

Sports
NASCAR on USA (2022)

WWE

WWE Raw (1993–2000; 2005)
A.M. Raw (2005)
WWE Tribute to the Troops (2005)
WWE Hall of Fame Induction Ceremony (2006)
WWE NXT (2019)

Syndicated
Law & Order: Special Victims Unit (1999)
NCIS (2008)
NCIS: Los Angeles (2011)
Chicago P.D. (2017)
Dateline (2017)
Last Man Standing (2021)
Chicago Fire (2022)
9-1-1 (2022)

Upcoming programming

Original programming

Unscripted

Reality
The Big D

In development

Scripted 
Walking Tall

Former programming

Original programming

Scripted
Check it Out! (1986–88)
Sanchez of Bel Air (1986)
The Ray Bradbury Theater (1987–92; seasons 3–6)
Airwolf (1987; season 4)
The New Alfred Hitchcock Presents (1987–89; seasons 2–4)
The Hitchhiker (1989–91; seasons 5 & 6)
Silk Stalkings (1993–99; seasons 3–8)
TekWar (1994–96; four TV movies and series)
Duckman (1994–97)
Weird Science (1994–98)
Tattooed Teenage Alien Fighters from Beverly Hills (1994–95)
Campus Cops (1996)
Pacific Blue (1996–2000)
The Big Easy (1996–97)
Johnnytime (1997)
Lost on Earth (1997)
La Femme Nikita (1997–2001)
The Net (1998–99)
Sins of the City (1998)
G vs E (1999; moved to Sci Fi Channel)
Cover Me: Based on the True Life of an FBI Family (2000–01)
Manhattan, AZ (2000)
The War Next Door (2000)
The Huntress (2000–01)
The Dead Zone (2002–07)
Monk (2002–09)
Peacemakers (2003)
Traffic (2004; miniseries)
Touching Evil (2004)
The 4400 (2004–07)
Kojak (2005)
Psych (2006–14)
Burn Notice (2007–13)
Law & Order: Criminal Intent (2007–11)
In Plain Sight (2008–12)
The Starter Wife (2008; TV series)
Royal Pains (2009–16)
White Collar (2009–14)
Covert Affairs (2010–14)
Fairly Legal (2011–12)
Suits (2011–19)
Necessary Roughness (2011–13)
Common Law (2012)
Political Animals (2012)
Graceland (2013–15)
Sirens (2014–15)
Playing House (2014–17)
Rush (2014)
Satisfaction (2014–15)
Benched (2014)
Dig (2015)
Complications (2015)
Mr. Robot (2015–19)
Donny! (2015)
Colony (2016–18)
Motive (2016; seasons 3-4; moved from ABC)
Queen of the South (2016–21)
Falling Water (2016–18)
Eyewitness (2016)
Shooter (2016–18)
The Sinner (2017–21)
Damnation (2017–18)
Unsolved (2018)
The Purge (2018–19)
Pearson (2019)
Treadstone (2019)
Dare Me (2019–20)
Briarpatch (2020)
Dirty John (2020)

Unscripted
Calliope (1978–93)
USA Thursday Game of the Week (1979–83)
NBA on USA (1979–84)
NHL on USA (1979–85)
  MISL on USA (1980-82) 
Black Entertainment Television (1980–83)
New Wave Theatre (1981–83)
Night Flight (1981–88)
Alive and Well! (1981–86)
You! Magazine (1981–84)
PGA Tour on USA (1982–2007, 2010)
USA Cartoon Express (1982–96)
USA Tuesday Night Fights (1982–98)
Are You Anybody? (1982–83)
Co-Ed (1982–84)
Hot Spots (1982–84)
Scholastic Sports Academy (1982–84)
Sonya (1982–85)
Woman's Day USA (1982–83)
Southwest Championship Wrestling (1982–83)Radio 1990 (1983–86)WWF All American Wrestling (1983–94)Kung Fu Theatre (1983–85)Cover Story (1984–89)USA Saturday Nightmares (1984–94)Westminster Kennel Club Dog Show (1984–2003)WWF Tuesday Night Titans (1984–86)WWF Prime Time Wrestling (1985–93)Commander USA's Groovie Movies (1985–89)The Dick Cavett Show (1985–86; returned to ABC)Jackpot (1985–88; moved to syndication)Chain Reaction (1986–91)Dance Party USA (1986–92)Love Me, Love Me Not (1986–87)Bumper Stumpers (1987)WWF Royal Rumble (1988)USA Up All Night (1989–98)Camp Midnite (1989)American Bandstand (1989)USA Updates (1989–2000)USA World Premiere Movie (1989–96; banner for TV movies produced exclusively for, or co-produced by, USA)USA Gonzo Games (1991–92)Case Closed (1992–94)WWF Mania (1993–96)Free 4 All (1994–95)Quicksilver (1994–95)WWF Action Zone (1994–96)CNET Central (1995–99)USA Action Extreme Team (1995–98)USA Live (1995–97)The Big Date (1996–97)WWF Superstars of Wrestling (1996–00; previously in syndication, moved to TNN)WWF LiveWire (1996–2000; moved to TNN)Grill Me (1996; 1 episode)Reel Wild Cinema with Sandra Bernhard (1996–98)USA High (1997–99; reran until 2001)Claude's Crib (1997)Killers in the House (1998; TV movie)Cool Tech (1998–99)The New Edge (1998–99)The Web (1998–99)WWF Sunday Night Heat (1998–2000; moved to MTV)Strip Poker (1999–2000)Farmclub (1999–2000)Happy Hour (1999)Crush (2000)Eco-Challenge: The Expedition Race (2000–02)Friends or Lovers (2000)Lover or Loser (2000–01)Cannonball Run 2001Smush (2001)Combat Missions (2002)Nashville Star (2003–07; moved to NBC)Helen of Troy (2003; miniseries)D.C. Sniper: 23 Days of Fear (2003; TV movie)Stealing Christmas (2003; TV movie)House Wars (2003)Spartacus (2004; miniseries)The Last Ride (2004; TV movie)Frankenstein (2004; TV movie)Cool Money (2005; TV movie)Three Wise Guys (2005; TV movie)Made in the USA (2005)Boost Mobile MLG Pro Circuit (2006)Underfunded (2006; TV movie)The Starter Wife (2007; miniseries)Dr. Steve-O (2007)To Love and Die (2008; TV movie)WWE Tough Enough (2011, 2015)The Moment (2013)First Impressions (2016)WWE SmackDown (2016–19; moved to Fox)According to Chrisley (2017)American Ninja Warrior: Ninja vs. Ninja (2017; moved from Esquire Network and was formally titled Team Ninja Warrior)U.S. Open tennis championshipUSA Sci-Fi TheaterWorld League of American FootballBig Star Little Star (2017)The Cromarties (2017)Real Country (2018)The Radkes (2019)The Biggest Loser (2020)Cannonball (2020)Snake in the Grass (2022)

TV moviesPsych: The Movie (2017)
Nash Bridges film (2021)

Syndicated programmingCoronation Street (1982–83)Adventures in Paradise (1983–84)The Alfred Hitchcock Hour (1983–93)Dragnet (1983–90)Bob & Carol & Ted & Alice (1984)Bridget Loves Bernie (1984)Candid Camera (1984–88)The Flying Nun (1984)Gidget (1984)The Gong Show (1984–87)Lancer (1984–86)Make Me Laugh (1984–86)Tales of the Unexpected (1984–85)The Virginian (1984–87)Bullseye (1985–87)Chain Reaction (1985–91)The Edge of Night (1985–89)He & She (1985–87)The Joker's Wild (1985–87, 1991–94)The Master (1985, 1989)Peyton Place (1985)The Prisoner (1985)Room 222 (1985–88)All-Star Blitz (1986)Anything for Money (1986–88)The Girl with Something Extra (1986–88)Good Morning World (1986)Let's Make a Deal (1986–88)Liar's Club (1986–87)Madame's Place (1986–91)The Monroes (1986)Mr. Merlin (1986–88)Oh Madeline (1986–88)Riptide (1986–88)The Second Hundred Years (1986–87)That Girl (1986–88)Wanted: Dead or Alive (1986–87)The Benny Hill Show (1987)Code Red (1987–88)The Great Space Coaster (1987)Hot Potato (1987–90)The New Mike Hammer (1987–92)Play the Percentages (1987–89)Press Your Luck (1987–95)Search for Tomorrow (1987–89)Temperatures Rising (1987–88)Tic-Tac-Dough (1987–90, 1993–94)$25,000/$100,000 Pyramid (1988–95)Diamonds (1988–91)Bustin' Loose (1988–89)Double Trouble (1988–91)High Rollers (1988–91)Miami Vice (1988–91)Murder, She Wrote (1988–97)Otherworld (1988)Private Eye (1988–91)Street Hawk (1988–91)Tales of the Gold Monkey (1988–90)The Equalizer (1989–91)Face the Music (1989–90)Hollywood Squares (1989–93)It's Your Move (1989–92)Land of the Giants (1989–92)The Law & Harry McGraw (1989–92)Lost in Space (1989–91)My Sister Sam (1989–93)Name That Tune (1989–91)Philip Marlowe, Private Eye (1989–90)The Three Stooges (1989)Werewolf (1989–91)Wipeout (1989–91)Counterstrike (1990–93)Divorce Court (1990–93)Dog House (1990–93)Just the Ten of Us (1990–96)MacGyver (1990–97)The Partridge Family (1990)Swamp Thing: The Series (1990–93)Win, Lose or Draw (1990–92)Beyond Reality (1991–93)Darkroom (1991)The Judge (1991–93)My Two Dads (1991–95, 2002)Scrabble (1991–95)Superior Court (1991–93)Welcome Back, Kotter (1991–94)American Gladiators (1992–96)Bosom Buddies (1992–95)First Business (1992–96)Quantum Leap (1992–96)Sale of the Century (1992–94)The Facts of Life (1993–98)Major Dad (1993–97, 1999)The Odd Couple (1993–94)Parker Lewis Can't Lose (1993–96)Swans Crossing (1993–94)Talk About (1993)Wings (1993–2002, 2008–11)Bloomberg Television (1994–2004)Caesars Challenge (1994)Knight Rider (1994–96)Magnum, P.I. (1994–99)Forever Knight (1995–96)Highlander: The Series (1995–98)Love Connection (1995–97)The People's Court (1995–97)Renegade (1995–2001)America's Most Wanted (1996–97)Hercules: The Legendary Journeys (1996–2001)Top Cops (1996–97)Walker, Texas Ranger (1996–2011)Xena: Warrior Princess (1996–2001)Baywatch (1997–2001)Gimme a Break! (1997–98)Perfect Strangers (1997–98)Saved by the Bell: The New Class (1997–2001)Sirens (1997)Webster (1997–98)Boston Common (1998–2000)America's Funniest Home Videos (1998–2001)The Jeff Foxworthy Show (1998–99)New York Undercover (1998–2001)The Single Guy (1998–2000)Something So Right (1998–2001)Almost Perfect (1999–2002)Fired Up (1999–2002)JAG (1999–2011)The Naked Truth (1999–2000)Ned and Stacy (1999–2001)Viper (1999–2001)Working (1999–2001)Carol Burnett and Friends (2000–01)Doctor Doctor (2000–01)Hearts Afire (2000–01)Jesse (2000–02)The John Larroquette Show (2000–02)Martin (2000–04)Nash Bridges (2000–06)Veronica's Closet (2000–02)Living Single (2001–03)Coach (2004–07)The District (2004–06)House M.D. (2006–18)Becker (2008–11)CSI: Crime Scene Investigation (2011–20)Cheers (2012)Modern Family (2013–21)Las Vegas (2020)New Amsterdam (2020)Sex and the City (2020)Zoey's Extraordinary Playlist (2020)Law & Order: Organized Crime (2021)Ordinary Joe (2021)Resident Alien (2021)Young Rock (2021)

USA Cartoon Express

USA Action Extreme TeamAdventures of Sonic the Hedgehog (1995–97)Exosquad (1995–96)Highlander: The Animated Series (1995–96)Savage Dragon (1995–98)Sonic the Hedgehog (SatAM) (1995–97)Street Fighter (1995–98)WildC.A.T.s (1995–96)Action Man (1996–97)Double Dragon (1996–98)Mario All Stars (The Super Mario Bros. Super Show! and Super Mario World) (1996–97)Mighty Max (1996–98)Mortal Kombat: Defenders of the Realm (1996–98)Street Sharks (1996–97)Ultraforce (1996–98)Wing Commander Academy (1996–98)Gargoyles (1997–98)Sailor Moon'' (1997–98)

Notes

References

Lists of television series by network
USA Network original programming